Ivanava is a city in Brest Region, Belarus, and the administrative center of Ivanava District.

History

First mentioned in the 14th century, initially it was a village named Porkhovo. In 1423 it was granted by the king Władysław Jagiełło to the cathedral in Lutsk. Renamed to Janów, in 1465 it was granted with city rights. A small town in Polesia, it shared the fate of the region. On May 16, 1657 it was the seat of the martyrdom of Saint Andrzej Bobola. Annexed by Russia during the Partitions of Poland in 1795, the town did not develop much, mostly because of the proximity of much more populous town of Pinsk. At the end of the 19th century it had circa 3000 inhabitants, mostly peasants and workers in a local minor textile works.

Between 1915 and 1918 occupied by Germany, in 1919 it was transferred to Poland. During the Polish-Bolshevik War it was briefly occupied by the Russians between July and October 1920. After retaken by Poland, the town was the centre of mobilization of Gen. Jarosławcew's 3rd Volga Infantry Division, part of Gen. Stanisław Bułak-Bałachowicz's forces. Between the wars, the town remained a minor and rather non-notable centre of commerce in the area. In 1926 it was linked with the world by a new railroad. This however did not lead to fast development as the industry preferred other regions of Poland.

In 1939, the town was retaken by the Soviet Union and annexed to the Byelorussian Soviet Socialist Republic. On June 27, 1941 the town was occupied by Nazi Germany. During the German occupation most of the Jewish inhabitants of the area were murdered in the Holocaust. On January 22, 1943 30 locals were murdered as a reprisal for Ponury's action against the Gestapo prison in Pinsk (see 1943 Pinsk Prison Raid). In July 1944 the town was liberated by the Soviet 61st Army.

A seat of a rayon between 1954 and 1962 and again from 1965, since 1991 the town is part of independent Belarus.

External links
 Photos on Radzima.org
 Pre-war photos of Janów Poleski
 Janów on a lithography by Napoleon Orda
 Janów-Kamień Koszyrski railroad as of 1926
 

Cities in Belarus
Shtetls
Populated places in Brest Region
Brest Litovsk Voivodeship
Kobrinsky Uyezd
Polesie Voivodeship
Holocaust locations in Belarus